Ravi Patel is the name of:

 Ravi Patel (actor) (born 1978), American actor
 Ravi Patel (cricketer) (born 1991), English cricketer